Heart of Africa, From November 13, 2005, to March 11, 2006, Channel One aired a similar reality show, Heart of Africa (at first it was mistakenly called a new season of The Last Hero by some media outlets). Unlike The Last Hero (where living on an uninhabited island was a prerequisite), those arriving in Africa had to live with the Zulu people. The reality show was produced by VID television company.

The contestants for this season were split up into two tribes of nine known as the River and Sand tribes. Throughout their time in South Africa the contestants lived near a Zulu village and interacted with the natives of the village on several occasions. As a twist, on several occasions the natives were allowed to award immunity to the contestant of their choice. On the eighth day, a tribal swap occurred in which Sand tribe member Vitaly Ratnikov and River tribe member Rada "Lesha" Razborkis switched tribes. Following the merge, three of the previously voted contestants returned to the competition (Olga Shakira in episode 9 and Alexey Kuzkin and Rada "Lesha" Razborkis in episode 13). When it came time for the final six, the contestants competed in an immunity challenge, followed by a final tribal council. The final five then took part in a school yard pick to determine who would be the final four. The final four were then forced to compete in two challenges in order to determine who would be the finalists. Ultimately, it was Alexander “Conan” Alexeev  who won this season over Elena “Lena” Pinchuk by a jury vote of 8–2.

Contestants

References

External links
(Official Site) 

Last Hero seasons
2005 Russian television seasons
2006 Russian television seasons
Television shows filmed in South Africa